Bushra Gohar is a Pakistani Pashtun politician and a senior leader of the National Democratic Movement (NDM). She has served as a member of the National Assembly of Pakistan from 2008 to 2013. She is an activist in the Pashtun Tahafuz Movement (PTM), a social movement campaigning for Pashtun human rights. She was formerly the senior vice-president of Awami National Party (ANP).

Biography
Born in Swabi to a Pashtun family, Gohar studied economics at the University of Peshawar and moved to the United States where she received master's degree in human resource management from Wilmington University in 1991 followed by a postgraduate certificate in South Asian Studies from the University of Pennsylvania. On return to Pakistan, she worked as a consultant with UNDP, USAID, and UKAid. In 2000, Gohar became a member of the National Commission on the Status of Women, a position she retained until 2003.

Her father, Ali Gohar Khan, was a Colonel in the Pakistan Army. Two of her paternal uncles, Sher Khan and Bahadur Sher, were Generals in the army, while a third one, Shahnawaz, was also a Colonel.

Political career
She was elected to the National Assembly of Pakistan as a candidate of Awami National Party on a reserved seat for women from Khyber Pakhtunkhwa in 2008 Pakistani general election.

From 2016 to 2018, she served as the senior vice-president of Awami National Party until the party suspended her membership.

References 

Living people
Awami National Party politicians
Pakistani MNAs 2008–2013
Women members of the National Assembly of Pakistan
People from Swabi District
Pakistani human rights activists
1961 births
University of Peshawar alumni
University of Pennsylvania alumni
Wilmington University alumni
21st-century Pakistani women politicians
National Democratic Movement (Pakistan) politicians